Heliopora is a genus of cnidarian in the monotypic family Helioporidae. It is a reef building hard coral but belongs to the subclass Octocorallia and is therefore most closely related to soft corals, sea pens, fan corals and sea whips and not to the main reef-building Scleractinian corals, which belong to subclass Hexacorallia.  Currently only three species are known, one of which is known only from fossils: 

 Heliopora coerulea (Pallas, 1766) - blue coral
 Heliopora fijiensis† Hoffmeister, 1945 
Heliopora hiberniana Richards, Yasuda, Kikuchi, Foster, Mitsuyuki, Stat, Suyama & Wilson, 2018

References

Octocorallia genera
Helioporidae